The Herbivorous Family is a 1993 novel by Nobel prize-winning author Mo Yan.

1993 Chinese novels
Novels by Mo Yan